Przemysław Wacha (born 31 January 1981) is a Polish badminton player.

Career
Wacha played badminton at the 2004 Summer Olympics in men's singles, losing in the first round to Wong Choong Hann of Malaysia. He won the bronze medal at the 2008 European Badminton Championships. Wacha also played badminton at the 2008 Summer Olympics in men's singles, losing in the round of 16 to Bao Chunlai of China. At the 2012 Summer Olympics, he didn't qualify from the pool stages. From 2004 to 2010 Wacha won seven consecutive titles at the Polish National Badminton Championships. At the 2016 Rio Olympics Wacha played men's doubles with compatriot Adam Cwalina, but they didn't advance from the group stage.

Achievements

European Championships
Men's singles

European Junior Championships 
Boys' singles

Boys' doubles

BWF Grand Prix 
The BWF Grand Prix had two levels, the Grand Prix and Grand Prix Gold. It was a series of badminton tournaments sanctioned by the Badminton World Federation (BWF) and played between 2007 and 2017.

Men's singles

Men's doubles

  BWF Grand Prix Gold tournament
  BWF Grand Prix tournament

BWF International Challenge/Series 
Men's singles

Men's doubles

  BWF International Challenge tournament
  BWF International Series tournament

References

1981 births
Living people
People from Głubczyce
Sportspeople from Opole Voivodeship
Polish male badminton players
Olympic badminton players of Poland
Badminton players at the 2004 Summer Olympics
Badminton players at the 2008 Summer Olympics
Badminton players at the 2012 Summer Olympics
Badminton players at the 2016 Summer Olympics